Daniel Labaronne is a French politician representing La République En Marche!. He was elected to the French National Assembly on 18 June 2017, representing the department of Indre-et-Loire.

Labaronne was born to a family of farmers, and is currently an economics professor at the University of Bordeaux.

External links
 Official Page on the National Assembly Site

References

Living people
Deputies of the 15th National Assembly of the French Fifth Republic
La République En Marche! politicians
1955 births
Deputies of the 16th National Assembly of the French Fifth Republic
Academic staff of the University of Bordeaux